Delma nasuta, also known as sharp-snouted delma or sharp-snouted legless lizard, is a species of lizard in the Pygopodidae family endemic to Australia.

References

Pygopodids of Australia
Delma
Reptiles described in 1974
Endemic fauna of Australia